Major General Peter Charles Harris (November 10, 1865 – March 18, 1951) was an officer in the United States Army who served as Adjutant General of the U.S. Army from 1918 to 1922.

Early life and education
Harris was born on November 10, 1865, in Ringston, Georgia.  He attended the United States Military Academy and graduated in the class of 1888. Among his classmates there were several men who would, like Harris himself, eventually attain the rank of general officer, such as James W. McAndrew, William M. Morrow, William Robert Dashiell, Robert Lee Howze, Peyton C. March, Eli Alva Helmick, Henry Jervey Jr., William Voorhees Judson, John Louis Hayden, Edward Anderson, William H. Hart, Charles Aloysius Hedekin and William S. Peirce.

Military career
He received a commission for the 13th Infantry Regiment. He also served with the 9th Infantry, the 10th Infantry, and the Twenty-Fourth Infantry.

He participated in the Battle of San Juan Hill and the Siege of Santiago de Cuba, during the Spanish–American War.

He served in the Philippines from 1899 to 1900, in 1905 to 1907, and May 21, 1907 to April 13, 1908.

He attended the Infantry and Cavalry School at Fort Leavenworth, Kansas, and graduated from the Army War College in 1908.

In 1916, he started service in the Adjutant General's Office.  He was appointed adjutant general on September 1, 1918.

He retired from service on August 31, 1922.

Awards
He received the Army Distinguished Service Medal due to his services during World War I. The citation for the medal reads:

{{Quote|The President of the United States of America, authorized by Act of Congress, July 9, 1918, takes pleasure in presenting the Army Distinguished Service Medal to Major General Peter Charles Harris, United States Army, for exceptionally meritorious and distinguished services to the Government of the United States, in a duty of great responsibility during World War I. During his service in the Adjutant General's Department, General Harris' zeal, energy, and judgment have been made manifest by the reforms accomplished in record keeping systems in the War Department and in the Army.<ref>

His other awards and honors included Commander in the Legion of Honour from France and Commander in the Order of the Crown of Italy.

Death and legacy
He died at Walter Reed Medical Center on March 18, 1951. He is buried in Princeton Cemetery in Princeton, New Jersey.

See also
List of Adjutant Generals of the U.S. Army
List of major generals in the United States Regular Army before July 1, 1920

References

External links

1865 births
1951 deaths
Military personnel from Georgia (U.S. state)
Adjutants general of the United States Army
Recipients of the Distinguished Service Medal (US Army)
Burials at Princeton Cemetery
United States Army generals of World War I
United States Military Academy alumni
United States Army generals
United States Army Command and General Staff College alumni
United States Army War College alumni
American military personnel of the Spanish–American War
Recipients of the Order of the Crown (Italy)
Commandeurs of the Légion d'honneur
United States Army Infantry Branch personnel